Anahuac or Anáhuac may refer to:

Places

Mexico
 Anahuac (Aztec), placename used by the Aztecs to refer to the Basin of Mexico
 Anahuac Valley, the ancient (Aztec) name of the Valley of Mexico
 Anáhuac (Monterrey Metro), a rapid transit train station 
 Anáhuac Municipality, Nuevo León
 , or Colonia Anáhuac, a town in Chihuahua

United States
 Anahuac, Texas
 Anahuac Formation, Texas
 Lake Anahuac, Texas

Other uses
 Anahuac (automobile), an American car briefly produced in 1922
 Fabrica de Aviones Anahuac, a Mexican aircraft manufacturer
 Anahuac University Network, a system of private higher education institutions in Mexico
 , in service 1934-38